The 2008–09 NHL season was the 92nd season of operation (91st season of play) of the National Hockey League (NHL). It was the first season since prior to the 2004–05 lockout in which every team played each other at least once during the season, following three seasons where teams only played against two divisions in the other conference (one division at home and one on the road). It began on October 4, with the regular season ending on April 12. The Stanley Cup playoffs ended on June 12, with the Pittsburgh Penguins taking the championship. The Montreal Canadiens hosted the 57th NHL All-Star Game at the Bell Centre on January 25, 2009, as part of the Canadiens' 100th season celebration.

League business

Canadian media rights
In June 2008, the NHL reached a new television deal with TSN, allowing the network to broadcast 70 regular season games per season featuring at least one Canadian team. The league also removed the restriction that only allowed all playoff games involving Canadian teams to air only on the CBC, even if it meant such games had to be broadcast regionally. The CBC and TSN continued to split the first three rounds of the playoffs, and the CBC still maintained exclusive coverage of the Stanley Cup Finals. But under the new deal, the CBC and TSN selects the rights to individual series using a draft-like setup, regardless if they involve Canadian teams.

Increase in salary cap
National Hockey League announced that the regular season salary cap would be going up for the fourth straight season. The 2008–09 salary cap is being increased by $6,400,000 (US) per team to bring the salary cap up to $56,700,000 (US). The salary floor is at $40,700,000 (US), which is higher than the salary cap on 2005–06 season.

Rule changes
The NHL brought in a number of rule changes for the start of the 2008–09 NHL season aimed at increasing offence and safety. The first rule change was to Rule 76.2 on faceoffs. The first faceoff of a power play will now be in the defending zone of the team that committed the foul, regardless of where the play was stopped. The second rule dealt with the issue of safety while players are pursuing the puck on a potential icing call. Rule 81.1 states that, "Any contact between opposing players while pursuing the puck on an icing must be for the sole purpose of playing the puck and not for eliminating the opponent from playing the puck. Unnecessary or dangerous contact could result in penalties being assessed to the offending player." The third rule change also dealt with faceoff position: if a puck is shot off the goal frame, goal post or crossbar, the subsequent faceoff will remain in the end zone where the puck went out of play. Another rule change prohibits TV commercials, game breaks, and any line changes immediately after an icing call.

Season schedule
The 2008–09 schedule returns to the pre-lockout schedule. The new schedule eliminates the three-year rotation where teams would only play teams in two of the three divisions of the opposite conference; instead the new schedule guarantees that each team plays every other team at least once. In this new schedule, each team will play their divisional rivals six times for a total of 24 games; they will play all other conference teams four times for a total of 40 games, and will play every team in the opposite conference at least once for a total of 15 games. To obtain a total of 82 games there are an additional three-wild card games; for the Canadian teams, the three-wild card games are composed of playing the three Canadian teams in the opposite conference an additional time.

European openers

The regular season started with four games played in Europe. The Ottawa Senators and the Pittsburgh Penguins played each other twice in Stockholm, Sweden with the two teams splitting a two-game premiere, and the New York Rangers and the Tampa Bay Lightning played each other twice in Prague, Czech Republic The Rangers swept Tampa Bay 2–0. The New York Rangers represented the NHL in the inaugural Victoria Cup challenge game as part of the club's pre-season schedule. The four teams also played some pre-season exhibition games in Europe.

Other than the four overseas regular season games starting October 4, October 9 was the actual first day of regular season games as far as widespread continental North American broadcast from most providers, including pay per view hockey packages. Other teams still played preseason games between October 4 and 6.

By February 23, 2009, all four teams who started the season in Europe had fired their coaches.

Winter Classic 

Because of the success of the 2008 Winter Classic, another outdoor game was held in the 2008–09 NHL season. While Yankee Stadium was considered an early favorite, in a game to be hosted by the Rangers, cold-weather issues involving the old stadium put that location out of the mix. Another site considered was Beaver Stadium at Penn State University, with that game to likely involve the Penguins and the Flyers.

On May 29, 2008, TSN reported that the 2009 NHL Winter Classic would be held in Chicago, Illinois on January 1, 2009, played between the Chicago Blackhawks and defending champion Detroit Red Wings. Soldier Field was considered an early candidate, however the NFL's Chicago Bears objected, citing a possible home game for the 2008 NFL playoffs that weekend (January 3–4); ironically, the Bears ended up being eliminated from contention in the last week. It was decided that the game would be played at Wrigley Field, the North Side home of the Chicago Cubs, as confirmed by the Minneapolis Star-Tribune on July 6. Ten days afterward, the NHL confirmed the reports that the game would officially be held on New Year's Day. Faceoff was scheduled for 1 pm EST (12 noon CST). The Red Wings won the game 6–4.

Trade deadline
The NHL and National Hockey League Players' Association (NHLPA) agreed to move the trade deadline from Tuesday, March 3, 2009, to Wednesday, March 4, 2009. This was done mainly because the schedule has twelve games on March 3 and only two on March 4.

General Managers' Meeting
At the meeting, held in Naples, Florida from March 9–11, 2009, general managers of the teams discussed issues that concerned them. Consensus on any topic would lead to action by the Board of Governors or the Competition committee in later meetings. Paul Kelly, executive director of the NHLPA, made a presentation on the topic of dangerous hits to the head, proposing new rules to penalize intentional hits. The general managers could not agree on the planned rule change and took no further action. Kelly intends to review the issue at the future Competition committee meeting, which is held after the Stanley Cup final. The general managers also discussed the topic of fighting in hockey, and agreed to penalize further players who start fights directly after face-offs and to further enforce the existing 'instigator' rule. The managers agreed to award a second-round compensatory pick in the 2009 entry draft to the New York Rangers due to the death of Alexei Cherepanov.

Scheduled events and deadlines
The Christmas holiday roster freeze went into effect on December 19, 2008, and ended on December 27, 2008.

The NHL Winter Classic was held on January 1, 2009, between the Detroit Red Wings and the Chicago Blackhawks at Wrigley Field.

For the Canadiens 100th anniversary season, the annual All-Star Game and the SuperSkills Competition was held in Montreal, Quebec.

The trade deadline was March 4 at 3 pm EST. The most notable trade was between the Phoenix Coyotes and Calgary Flames sending Olli Jokinen to Calgary, but there were fewer trades than at previous deadlines.

Regular season
The first goal of the season was scored by Markus Naslund of the New York Rangers in Prague against the Tampa Bay Lightning. On October 16, 2008, the Blackhawks fired head coach Denis Savard and replaced him with former Colorado Avalanche and St. Louis Blues head coach Joel Quenneville. On Saturday, October 25, the NHL scheduled fifteen games—with all 30 teams playing—for the second time in league history.

On November 3, 2008, in a game between the Columbus Blue Jackets and the New York Islanders, Islanders forward Chris Campoli scored twice in one overtime. First, Campoli retrieved a loose puck and fired a shot past Jacket's goaltender Fredrik Norrena. The shot went through the net and, while Campoli celebrated, the game continued. Campoli then received a pass in front of the goal and shot the puck again into the net.

Tampa Bay Lightning head coach Barry Melrose would record his first win as a head coach in over 13 years on October 21, 2008, with a 3–2 victory over the Atlanta Thrashers. However, the Lightning did not get off to a great start as hoped, and Melrose was fired by the Lightning with a 5–7–4 record. Rick Tocchet, who had been hired as assistant coach during the previous offseason, was promoted to interim head coach. Melrose subsequently re-signed with broadcaster ESPN. Melrose proceeded to get into a war of words with the Lightning management, accusing the management of interference during an interview on a Toronto radio station.

On December 2, 2008, Carolina Hurricanes' head coach Peter Laviolette was fired and Paul Maurice was rehired in his place. Ron Francis became the team's associate head coach.

During the annual December board of governors' meeting, the issue of the state of the economy was raised. The Phoenix Coyotes were reported to lose up to $35 million on the 2008–09 season. Asked to comment on Phoenix's loss, Commissioner Gary Bettman was quoted as saying "They're going to get through the season just fine." The Buffalo Sabres, while not for sale, had been approached for purchase.

On December 5, Sean Avery of the Dallas Stars was suspended six games for 'off-colour' remarks prior to a game against the Calgary Flames. On December 14, the Stars' management announced that he would not be returning to the team. After Avery's reinstatement by the league, he reported to the Hartford Wolf Pack of the AHL. He was placed on re-entry waivers and was claimed by the New York Rangers, his team in 2007–08.

On December 23, the Toronto Globe and Mail reported that the Phoenix Coyotes were receiving financial assistance from the league in the form of advances on league revenues. The Coyotes pledged all of their assets to New York company SOF Investments LP to cover an estimated debt of $80 million. The team lost an estimated $200 million since 2001 and lost about $30 million this season. One of the team's owners, Jerry Moyes' principal source of revenue, Swift Transportation was also in financial difficulty. ESPN reported that the league had gotten involved with the operations of the Coyotes and their revenues. The NHL reportedly wanted to work with the city of Glendale, Arizona, which owns the arena and receives revenues from the team. ESPN also reported that Moyes wanted to sell his share of the team and that Hollywood film producer Jerry Bruckheimer was a possible interested purchaser.

In February 2009, three head coaches were relieved from their duties. On February 1, Craig Hartsburg was fired as head coach of the Ottawa Senators following a 17–24–7 start to the season and was immediately replaced by Binghamton Senators head coach Cory Clouston. On February 15, Dan Bylsma of the American Hockey League's Wilkes-Barre/Scranton Penguins was promoted to replace Michel Therrien of the Pittsburgh Penguins as interim head coach. Bylsma would later be announced as a permanent head coach of the team. On February 23, the New York Rangers fired Tom Renney following an overtime loss and he was replaced on the same day by TSN analyst and former Tampa Bay Lightning head coach, John Tortorella.

In March, goaltender Martin Brodeur returned to the New Jersey Devils after a long injury. He became the goaltender with most wins in league history, surpassing the record of Patrick Roy. Guy Carbonneau was also fired as the head coach of the Canadiens when the team was in danger of being eliminated from the playoffs.

In April, the Columbus Blue Jackets qualified for the playoffs for the first time in franchise history. The Carolina Hurricanes qualified for the playoffs for the first time since their 2006 Stanley Cup victory. The Ottawa Senators missed the playoffs for the first time since the 1995–96 season.

In an ironic twist, considering his injury woes of past seasons, Jordan Leopold played in all 64 games for the Colorado Avalanche. Upon being traded to the Calgary Flames Leopold played in all 19 remaining games for the Flames becoming the only NHL player to play 83 games of the 82 game 2008–09 season. Jacques Lemaire resigned as the first head coach of the Minnesota Wild on April 11 after missing the playoffs.

Scoring in the regular season improved somewhat from 2007–08, with an average of 5.7 goals scored per game (7,006 goals scored over 1,230 games). Goaltenders combined for 156 shutouts.

In May 2009, it was revealed that the NHL had taken control of the Phoenix Coyotes from the start of the season and had known of the financial difficulties of the team prior to the start of the 2008–09 season. After owner Jerry Moyes petitioned the club into bankruptcy against the league's wishes, so as to sell the team to Jim Balsillie who plans to move the team to Hamilton, Ontario, the league challenged the right of Moyes to file for bankruptcy. In the documents filed with the Phoenix bankruptcy court, the NHL stated that the league took official control of the team on November 14, 2008. The league then began advancing money to the club from league revenues, and made a loan to the club in February 2009, for a combined estimated total of $44.5 million over the full season. During the season, commissioner Bettman and deputy commissioner Bill Daly had made a series of denials and obfuscations, while firing the Coyotes CEO and laying off 18 Coyotes employees. Moyes' documents filed with the court indicated that the team had lost $73 million over the last three years, and that the projected loss was $45 million for 2008–09.

Jacques Martin became the head coach of the Montreal Canadiens on June 1 when former coach Bob Gainey returned to his general manager status. On June 3, Tony Granato was fired as the head coach of the Colorado Avalanche and was replaced on the next day by Joe Sacco, head coach of the Avs' top minor league affiliate the Lake Erie Monsters of the AHL. On June 9, despite Brent Sutter winning 51 games (a franchise record), he resigned as head coach of the New Jersey Devils after two first-round playoff losses because of family reasons. One day later on June 10, Dave Tippett was fired as head coach of the Dallas Stars after missing the playoffs for the first time since the 2001–02 season, when Rick Wilson took over as coach. Marc Crawford was named the new head coach for the 2009–10 season the next day. Todd Richards would be named the second head coach of the Minnesota Wild on June 15.

Final standings
GP = Games played, W = Wins, L = Losses, OTL = Overtime/shootout losses, GF = Goals for, GA = Goals against, Pts = Points.

Tiebreakers
Pittsburgh Received the 4 seed over Philadelphia by a wins tie breaker (45 to 44 in favor of PIT)
 Montreal Received the 8 seed over Florida, because they won the season series between the two (3-1)

Tiebreaking procedures

In the event of a tie in points in the standings at the end of the season, ties are broken using the following tiebreaking procedures.
The higher ranked team is the one with:
The greater number of games won.
The greater number of points earned in games between the tied clubs.
The greater differential between goals for and against for the entire regular season.

Playoffs

Bracket
In each round, the highest remaining seed in each conference was matched against the lowest remaining seed. The higher-seeded team is awarded home ice advantage, which gave them a possible maximum of four games on their home ice, with the lower-seeded team getting a possible maximum of three. In the Stanley Cup Finals, home ice is determined based on regular season points. Each best-of-seven series followed a 2–2–1–1–1 format. This meant that the higher-seeded team had home ice for games one and two, and if necessary, five and seven, while the lower-seeded team had home ice for games three, four and, if necessary, six.

Awards

All-Star teams
First All-Star team
 Forwards: Alexander Ovechkin • Evgeni Malkin • Jarome Iginla
 Defencemen: Mike Green • Zdeno Chara
 Goaltender: Tim Thomas

Second All-Star team
 Forwards: Zach Parise • Pavel Datsyuk • Marian Hossa
 Defencemen: Nicklas Lidstrom • Dan Boyle
 Goaltender: Steve Mason

NHL All-Rookie team
 Forwards: Patrik Berglund • Kris Versteeg • Bobby Ryan
 Defencemen: Drew Doughty • Luke Schenn
 Goaltender: Steve Mason

Player statistics

Scoring leaders

GP = Games played; G = Goals; A = Assists; Pts = Points; +/– = Plus/minus; PIM = Penalty minutes

Source: NHL

Leading goaltenders

GP = Games played; Min = Minutes played; W = Wins; L = Losses; OT = Overtime/shootout losses; GA = Goals against; SO = Shutouts; Sv% = Save percentage; GAA = Goals against average

Records
 February 14, 2009 – Mike Green, defenceman with the Washington Capitals, scored in eight consecutive games to set a new NHL record for a defenceman.
 February 15, 2009 – Mike Richards, center with the Philadelphia Flyers, became the first player in NHL history to score three career 3-on-5 shorthanded goals when he beat New York Rangers goaltender Henrik Lundqvist in a 5–2 win
 March 12, 2009 – Henrik Lundqvist, goaltender with the New York Rangers, became the first goaltender in NHL history to win 30 games in each of his first four seasons.
 March 17, 2009 – Martin Brodeur, goaltender with the New Jersey Devils, won his 552nd game, surpassing Patrick Roy for the all-time wins record.
 April 8, 2009 – Curtis Joseph, goaltender with the Toronto Maple Leafs, lost his 352nd game, tying Gump Worsley for most losses by a goaltender.
 June 12, 2009 – Sidney Crosby became the youngest captain in NHL history to win the Stanley Cup.
 June 12, 2009 – Evgeni Malkin became the first Russian player in NHL history to win the Conn Smythe Trophy.

Coaches

Eastern Conference
Atlanta Thrashers: John Anderson
Boston Bruins: Claude Julien
Buffalo Sabres: Lindy Ruff
Carolina Hurricanes: Peter Laviolette and Paul Maurice
Florida Panthers: Peter DeBoer
Montreal Canadiens: Guy Carbonneau and Bob Gainey
New Jersey Devils: Brent Sutter
New York Islanders: Scott Gordon
New York Rangers: Tom Renney and John Tortorella 
Ottawa Senators: Craig Hartsburg and Cory Clouston
Philadelphia Flyers: John Stevens
Pittsburgh Penguins: Michel Therrien and Dan Bylsma
Tampa Bay Lightning: Barry Melrose and Rick Tocchet
Toronto Maple Leafs: Ron Wilson
Washington Capitals: Bruce Boudreau

Western Conference
Anaheim Ducks: Randy Carlyle
Calgary Flames: Mike Keenan
Chicago Blackhawks: Denis Savard and Joel Quenneville
Colorado Avalanche: Joe Sacco
Columbus Blue Jackets: Ken Hitchcock
Dallas Stars: Dave Tippett
Detroit Red Wings: Mike Babcock
Edmonton Oilers: Craig MacTavish
Los Angeles Kings: Terry Murray
Minnesota Wild: Jacques Lemaire
Nashville Predators: Barry Trotz
Phoenix Coyotes: Wayne Gretzky
San Jose Sharks: Todd McLellan
St. Louis Blues: Andy Murray
Vancouver Canucks: Alain Vigneault

Milestones

First games

The following is a list of players of note that played their first NHL game in 2008–09, listed with their first team:

Last games

The following is a list of players of note who played their last NHL game in 2008–09, listed with their team:

See also
 Season structure of the NHL
 2009 Stanley Cup playoffs
 2008 NHL Entry Draft
 2007–08 NHL season
 2008–09 NHL transactions
 2009 NHL Winter Classic
 57th National Hockey League All-Star Game
 National Hockey League All-Star Game
 2008 in sports
 2009 in sports
 Victoria Cup

References

External links

 
1
1